Braima Embaló Sambú (born 20 March 2001) is a Portuguese professional footballer who plays as a midfielder for Segunda Liga club B-SAD.

Club career
A youth product of Belenenses, Sambú signed his first professional contract with B-SAD on 12 May 2020. He made his professional debut with B-SAD in a 1–0 Primeira Liga loss to S.C. Braga on 19 December 2021, coming on as a sub in the 73rd minute.

Personal life
Born in Portugal, Sambú is of Bissau-Guinean descent.

References

External links

2001 births
Living people
Portuguese footballers
Portuguese sportspeople of Bissau-Guinean descent
Association football midfielders
Belenenses SAD players
Campeonato de Portugal (league) players
Primeira Liga players